Stabroek Market is the largest market of Georgetown, Guyana. Located in the centre of the capital city, the market is housed in an iron and steel structure with a prominent clock tower.

Construction 
In 1842, the Georgetown Town Council designated the current location of the market on Water Street, officially recognizing it as a market despite the fact that it had served such a capacity for quite some time. The market was designed by an American engineer Nathaniel McKay, and constructed by the Edgemoor Iron Company of Delaware, USA over the period 1880-1881. Construction of the iron and steel structure was completed in 1881 and may be the oldest structure still in use in the city.

Though the architectural style is elusive, the iron structure and the prominent clock tower is reminiscent of the Victorian era of Great Britain (see British colonization of Guyana for more information).

Market 

The Stabroek Market area is easily the busiest such place in the city, always bustling with people and activity. It is a central hub for taxis and "minibuses", and also for ferries that transport people and goods from all towns and villages along the Demerara River.

Stabroek Market is widely known as the biggest market location in Guyana, where many sellers go to make a living. The market has attracted a great variety of business owners, whose wares range from jewelry to clothes to produce. Stabroek Market is filled with customers every day and is known for its clock located at the top of the building.

Stabroek Market is located in the middle of what Guyanese people call "Town", where many other major businesses surround its tall and recognized building. Stabroek Market is one of Georgetown's main attractions and is renowned throughout Guyana.

Crime 
Stabroek Market is generally not a high crime area, but robberies do occur from time to time. In 2011, a grenade attack at Stabroek Market killed one person and injured several others.

References

External links
Aerial view

Commercial buildings completed in 1881
Buildings and structures in Georgetown, Guyana
Retail markets in Guyana
1881 establishments in the British Empire